NBA Live 2005 is the 2004 installment of the NBA Live video games series. The cover features Carmelo Anthony as a member of the Denver Nuggets. The game was developed by EA Sports and released in 2004 for PlayStation 2, Xbox,  GameCube, and Microsoft Windows.

Gameplay

EA Sports Freestyle Air. This mode allows the game player to become an offensive force with new style dunks, user controlled tip-ins, and more.
NBA All-Star Weekend. This mode allows the game player to play in the NBA All-Star Weekend, year-after-year, in Dynasty mode or go right to  the Weekend in features on the main menu page. NBA All-Star Weekend includes the Rookie vs Sophomore game, the NBA All-Star game, the Slam Dunk competition and the 3 point competition.
Create-A-Player. In this mode, gamers can create their own player and can customize the looks, shoes, and the college attended of the fictitious created player.

Reception

By July 2006, the PlayStation 2 version of NBA Live 2005 had sold 1.6 million copies and earned $54 million in the United States. Next Generation ranked it as the 24th highest-selling game launched for the PlayStation 2, Xbox or GameCube between January 2000 and July 2006 in that country. Combined sales of NBA Live console games released in the 2000s reached 8 million units in the United States by July 2006.

The game received "favorable" reviews on all platforms according to video game review aggregator Metacritic.  In Japan, Famitsu gave the PlayStation 2 version a score of 32 out of 40.

See also
 ESPN NBA 2K5

References

External links

2004 video games
Windows games
GameCube games
PlayStation 2 games
Xbox games
NBA Live
Electronic Arts games
Video games developed in Canada
Video games set in 2004
Video games set in 2005
Multiplayer and single-player video games